Steve Briggs (born 2 December 1946) is a former footballer who played for Doncaster Rovers and Yeovil Town as centre forward.

Senior club career

Leeds United
Briggs signed for high flying 1st Division side Leeds United straight from school, though never managed to get beyond playing for the reserves.

Doncaster Rovers
He moved to English Division 4 club Doncaster Rovers in February 1969, scoring on his debut in a 7–0 victory over Aldershot on 23 February. He went on to play in all the subsequent 17 League games that season, and score 4 goals in what was Doncaster's title winning year as they gained promotion to Division 3.

The following season he made 31 League appearances, scoring 8 goals, occasionally being replaced by Laurie Sheffield. He also played in 3 cup games and scored in the League Cup against Blackburn of Division 2.

The 1970-71 season was less successful for Doncaster as they were relegated, though Briggs managed 10 goals in 31 League and Cup games, sometimes playing inside right and right wing.

After making a total of 127 League and Cup appearances, scoring 36 goals, it was at the end of the 1972–73 season that he was released on a free transfer with Yeovil Town picking him up.

Yeovil Town
Briggs was released after just one season as Yeovil finished 6th in the Southern League.

Honours
Doncaster Rovers
English Division 4 winner 1968–69

References

1946 births
Living people
Footballers from Leeds
English footballers
English Football League players
Southern Football League players
Association football midfielders
Leeds United F.C. players
Doncaster Rovers F.C. players
Yeovil Town F.C. players